Local elections were held in Santa Cruz on Monday, May 9, 2022, as a part of the 2022 Philippine general election. Voters will select candidates for all local positions: a town mayor, vice mayor and town councilors, as well as members of the Sangguniang Panlalawigan, a governor, a vice-governor and a representative for the province's fourth congressional district in the House of Representatives.

Background 
In 2019 elections Edgar San Luis run as Mayor of Santa Cruz under the Nacionalista Party to succeed incumbent and term-limited Domingo Panganiban who wad running for Vice-Mayor. San Luis later won against to then incumbent Laguna Board member Joseph Kris Benjamin Agarao of PDP–Laban and to former incumbent Mayor Ariel Magcalas of KDP.

Incumbent Mayor Edgar San Luis is running for reelection under the Aksyon Demokratiko he facing Laguna's 4th District Benjamin Agarao Jr. of PDP–Laban.

During the campaign period of the 2022 election, Incumbent Mayor of Manila Isko Moreno endorsed Edgar San Luis and Louis de Leon and former Senator (later President) Bongbong Marcos endorsed Benjamin Agarao Jr. and Laarni Malibiran.

Tickets

Administration coalition

Primary opposition coalition

Other coalitions and parties

Results 
The candidates for mayor and vice mayor with the highest number of votes wins the seat; they are voted separately, therefore, they may be of different parties when elected.

Mayor 
Incumbent Edgar San Luis is running for reelection under Aksyon Demokratiko his main opponent is Incumbent Laguna's 4th District Representative Benjamin Agarao Jr. of PDP–Laban.

Vice Mayor 
Incumbent Laarni Malibiran is running for reelection her main opponent is Incumbent Councilor and her predecessor Louis de Leon.

Sangguniang Bayan 
Election is via plurality-at-large voting: A voter votes for up to eight candidates, then the eight candidates with the highest number of votes are elected.

Notes

References 

2022 Philippine general election
2022 Philippine local elections
Elections in Laguna (province)
2022 elections in Calabarzon
May 2022 events in the Philippines